Bakóca is a village in Hegyhát District, northern Baranya county, in the Southern Transdanubia region of Hungary. Its population at the 2011 census was 285.

Geography 
It is part of the Southern Transdanubia statistical region, and administratively it falls under Baranya County and Hegyhát District.

Demographics

2011 census 
As of the census of 2011, there were 285 residents, 121 households, and 80 families living in the village. The population density was 69 inhabitants per square mile (27/km2). There were 134 dwellings at an average density of 33 per square mile (13/km2). The average household size was 2.24. The average number of children was 0.93. The average family size was 2.71.

Religious affiliation was 70.5% Roman Catholic, 4.1% Calvinist, 0.4% Greek Catholic, 2.2% other religion and 12.9% unaffiliated, with 10.0% declining to answer.

The village had an ethnic minority Roma population of 11.1%. A small number of residents also identified as German (0.7%) and other, non-native to Hungary (0.7%). The vast majority declared themselves as Hungarian (96.7%), with 2.6% declining to answer.

Local government 
The village is governed by a mayor with a four-person council. The local government of the village operates a joint council office with the nearby localities of Baranyajenő, Kisbeszterce, Kishajmás, Mindszentgodisa, Szágy, and Tormás. The seat of the joint council is in Mindszentgodisa.

As of the election of 2019, the village also has a local minority self-government for its Roma community, with three elected representatives.

Transportation

Railway 
The station is on the Pusztaszabolcs–Pécs and Dombóvár-Komló railway lines and is operated by MÁV.

External links 
 OpenStreetMap
 Detailed Gazetteer of Hungary

Notes

References

Populated places in Baranya County